Kuroshiodaphne saturata is a species of sea snail, a marine gastropod mollusc in the family Raphitomidae.

Description
The length of the shell varies between 9 mm and 28 mm.

A finely sculptured shell, conspicuous for a white somewhat raised band at the periphery of the body whorl, and adorned with other minor spiral bands. The coloration is a deepish brown. The outer lip is crenulale. The siphonal canal is slightly recurved.

Distribution
This marine species occurs off the Philippines and Japan

References

External links
 Gastropods.com: Kuroshiodaphne saturata
 

saturata
Gastropods described in 1845